Manfred Hiptmair (born 24 December 1965) is an Austrian judoka. He competed in the men's extra-lightweight event at the 1992 Summer Olympics.

References

External links
 

1965 births
Living people
Austrian male judoka
Olympic judoka of Austria
Judoka at the 1992 Summer Olympics
People from Schwanenstadt
Sportspeople from Upper Austria
20th-century Austrian people